Patrick Fabionn Lopes (20 August 1980 – 25 April 2016), sometimes known simply as Patrick, was a Brazilian footballer who played as a left back.

Football career
Patrick Lopes was born in Muriaé, Minas Gerais, spending the better part of his career with modest Brazilian clubs. In January 2005, he signed a two-year contract with Cruzeiro Esporte Clube, but was also loaned during that timeframe to Fortaleza Esporte Clube; in his country's Série A, other than those two teams, he also represented Guarani Futebol Clube.

In the 2007–08 season, Patrick Lopes had his first abroad experience, signing with U.D. Leiria from the Portuguese Primeira Liga. He played 13 times in his first year, but the side suffered relegation to the second division.

At age 32, Patrick Lopes returned to his homeland, seeing out his career two years later after spells in the regional leagues with Ituano Futebol Clube, Nacional Esporte Clube (MG) and Nacional Atlético Clube (Muriaé). He died on 25 April 2016 in São Paulo at the age of 35, from a brain aneurysm.

References

External links
Brazilian FA Database 

1980 births
2016 deaths
Sportspeople from Minas Gerais
Brazilian footballers
Association football defenders
Campeonato Brasileiro Série A players
Campeonato Brasileiro Série B players
Mirassol Futebol Clube players
União São João Esporte Clube players
Sociedade Esportiva e Recreativa Caxias do Sul players
Associação Atlética Anapolina players
Guarani FC players
Cruzeiro Esporte Clube players
Fortaleza Esporte Clube players
Esporte Clube São Bento players
Ituano FC players
Primeira Liga players
Liga Portugal 2 players
U.D. Leiria players
Brazilian expatriate footballers
Expatriate footballers in Portugal
Brazilian expatriate sportspeople in Portugal